Kreminna is a city in Sievierodonetsk Raion of Luhansk Oblast of Eastern Ukraine. Prior to 2020, it served as the administrative center of former Kreminna Raion. It has a population of  The city was occupied by Russian Armed Forces on 18 April 2022 during the 2022 Russian invasion of Ukraine who treats it as a city of Russia's Luhansk People's Republic.

History 
Kreminna was founded in 1680. Kreminna acquired the status of a city in 1938.

A local newspaper has been published in the city since December 1943.

Russo-Ukrainian War 

In July 2014, fighting took place in the city during the 2014 pro-Russian conflict in Ukraine. Kreminna remained under Ukrainian control.

In March 2022, during the 2022 Russian invasion of Ukraine, the pro-Russian mayor Volodymyr Struk who welcomed the Russian move, was found shot dead in the street after having been kidnapped from his home. Official advisor and a former deputy minister at the Ukrainian Ministry of Internal Affairs Anton Herashchenko said that Struk was judged under the Lynch Law. Herashchenko suggested that the mayor was murdered by "unknown patriots" as the Russian forces were 15 kilometers away from Kreminna.

On 11 March 2022, a residential care home for the elderly in Kreminna came under the fire of Russian tanks after Ukrainian armed forces set up a firing position there. According to Serhiy Haidai, the Ukrainian Governor of Luhansk Oblast, 56 elderly residents were killed and 15 others were taken by the Russian military to Svatove, a town under their control. Ukrainian emergency services and officials were unable to reach the incident scene due to ongoing fighting.

The town was the site of some of the first fighting of the Battle of Donbas during the Battle of Kreminna. On April 18, 2022, Russian and LNR troops entered the city of Kreminna, capturing it a few hours later after clashes with the Ukrainian Army. Haidai said "there were plans to evacuate the population," although due to heavy fighting it proved impossible. Haidai described the Russian forces as having "a huge amount of equipment".

On 13 September 2022, Haidai stated that Russian forces had fled Kreminna three days earlier, that the Ukrainian flag has been raised by local residents, but Ukrainian forces had not yet entered the town. However, on 14 September, Haidai stated that Russian troops had returned to Kreminna and "torn down the Ukrainian flag".

In early October 2022, the Battle of the Svatove-Kreminna line near the town was initiated.

In February 2023 the first recorded loss of a Russian BMPT Terminator was in a combat near Kreminna.

References

Cities in Luhansk Oblast
Sievierodonetsk Raion
Populated places established in 1680
Cities of district significance in Ukraine
1680 establishments in Russia